Kristian Meldgaard (born September 3, 1983) is a Danish handballer, currently playing for Danish Handball League side TMS Ringsted. He joined the club from league rivals FCK Håndbold in 2007.

External links
 info

1983 births
Living people
Danish male handball players